Future Supply Chain Solutions Ltd. (FSC) is an Indian supply chain and logistics company.

FSC caters to corporates in Food & FMCG; Apparels, Footwear & Accessories; Home and Furniture, Consumer Electronics & Hi- Tech; Automotive; Pharma and Light Engineering domain.

History
Future Supply Chain Solutions Ltd. (FSC) was incorporated in March, 2006.

References 

Logistics companies of India
Indian companies established in 2006
2006 establishments in Maharashtra
Companies based in Maharashtra
Future Group